The Ipcress File is a 1965 British spy film directed by Sidney J. Furie and starring Michael Caine. The screenplay, by Bill Canaway and James Doran, was based on Len Deighton's novel The IPCRESS File (1962). It received a BAFTA award for the Best British film released in 1965. In 1999, it was included at number 59 on the BFI list of the 100 best British films of the 20th century.

This film and its sequels were a deliberately downbeat alternative to the hugely successful James Bond films, even though some of the production team were previously involved with the 007 movies.

Plot
A scientist called Radcliffe is kidnapped from a train and his security escort killed. Harry Palmer, a British Army sergeant with a criminal past, now working for a Ministry of Defence organisation, is summoned by his superior, Colonel Ross, and transferred to a section headed by Major Dalby. Ross suspects that Radcliffe's disappearance is connected to the fact that sixteen other top British scientists have inexplicably left their jobs at the peak of their careers. He threatens Dalby that his group will go if Radcliffe cannot be recovered. Palmer is then introduced as a replacement for the dead security escort.

Afterwards, Dalby briefs his agents that the main suspect is Eric Grantby and his chief of staff, codenamed "Housemartin", and tells the team to find out where they are at present. Palmer is also introduced to and befriends Jock Carswell. Using a Scotland Yard contact, Palmer locates Grantby but, when Palmer tries to stop Grantby getting away, he is attacked by Housemartin.

Housemartin is arrested later but, before he can be questioned, he is killed by men impersonating Palmer and Carswell. Suspecting that Radcliffe is being held in a certain disused factory, Palmer orders a search, but nothing is found except a piece of audiotape marked "IPCRESS" that produces meaningless noise when played. Dalby then points out that the paper on which Grantby had written a false phone number is the programme for an upcoming military band concert. There they encounter Grantby and a deal is struck for Radcliffe's return.

The exchange goes as planned but, as they are leaving, Palmer shoots a man in the shadows who turns out to be a CIA agent. Subsequently, another CIA operative threatens to kill Palmer if he discovers that the death was not a mistake. Some days later, it becomes clear that while Radcliffe is physically unharmed, his mind has been affected and he can no longer function as a scientist. Carswell has discovered a book titled "Induction of Psychoneurosis by Conditioned Reflex under Stress" – IPCRESS – which he believes explains what has happened to Radcliffe and the other scientists. Carswell borrows Palmer's car to test his theory on Radcliffe, but is shot before reaching him.

Believing that he himself must have been the intended target, Palmer goes home to collect his belongings and there discovers the body of the second CIA agent. When he returns to the office, the IPCRESS file is missing from his desk. Ross had previously asked him to microfilm the file and Palmer now believes that he is being set up. When he informs Dalby what has happened and that he suspects Ross, Dalby tells him to leave town for a while.

On the train to Paris, Palmer is kidnapped and wakes up imprisoned in a cell in Albania. After several days without sleep, food and warmth, Grantby reveals himself as his kidnapper. Having previously read the file, Palmer realises that they are preparing to brainwash him. He uses pain to distract himself, but after many sessions under stress from disorientating images and loud electronic sounds, he succumbs. Grantby then instills a trigger phrase that will make Palmer follow any commands given to him.

Palmer eventually manages to escape and discovers that he is really still in London. He phones Dalby, who is in Grantby's company at the time. Dalby uses the trigger phrase and gets Palmer to call Ross to the warehouse where he had been held. As Dalby and Ross arrive, Palmer holds them both at gunpoint. Dalby accuses Ross of killing Carswell; Ross tells Palmer that he had been suspicious of Dalby and was investigating him.

Dalby now uses the trigger phrase again and tells Palmer to "Shoot the traitor now". As Palmer wavers, his hand strikes against a piece of equipment and the pain reminds him of his conditioning. Dalby goes for his gun and Palmer shoots him.
Ross then remarks that, in choosing Palmer for the assignment, he had hoped that Palmer's tendency to insubordination would be useful. When Palmer reproaches Ross for endangering him, he is told that this is what he is paid for.

Cast

Michael Caine as Harry Palmer
Guy Doleman as Colonel Ross
Nigel Green as Major Dalby
Sue Lloyd as Jean Courtney
Gordon Jackson as Jock Carswell
Aubrey Richards as Dr. Radcliffe
Frank Gatliff as Eric Grantby (Bluejay)
Thomas Baptiste as Barney
Oliver MacGreevy as Housemartin
Freda Bamford as Alice
Pauline Winter as Charlady
Anthony Blackshaw as Edwards
Barry Raymond as Gray
David Glover as Chilcott-Oakes
Stanley Meadows as Inspector Keightley
Peter Ashmore as Sir Robert 
Michael Murray as Raid Inspector
Anthony Baird as Raid Sergeant 
Tony Caunter as O.N.I. man
Douglas Blackwell as Murray
Glynn Edwards as Police Station Sergeant

Production

Development
Deighton was hired to write a screenplay for the James Bond film From Russia with Love, but later was let go because of a lack of progress. However, Deighton's brief involvement with Eon Productions led him to sell the film rights to his Harry Palmer novels to the Bond series co-producer Harry Saltzman, who had previously been known for producing "kitchen-sink realist" dramas. Among other crew members who worked on The Ipcress File and had also worked on the Bond films up to this point were the production designer Ken Adam, the film editor Peter Hunt and the film score composer John Barry.

Harry Saltzman gave Jimmy Sangster a copy of the novel to read. Sangster enjoyed the book and was eager to adapt the novel, suggesting Michael Caine to play the main role and Sidney J. Furie as director. However, Saltzman would not commit to the timeframe that Sangster insisted upon.

Sangster embellished Deighton's protagonist by removing the ambiguity of the novel. There it is only in Chapter 5 that Palmer remarks, "My name isn't Harry, but in this business it's hard to remember whether it ever had been". But from the opening scenes of the film, Sangster's screenplay identifies Caine's character clearly as someone who cares little for authority, who indulges in quick repartee and has an interest in good food. Newspaper cuttings shown in Palmer's kitchen are actually cookery articles written for The Observer by Deighton, who was an accomplished cook himself. For a scene where Palmer prepares a meal, Deighton attempted to teach Caine how to crack an egg with one hand, which Caine could not manage. As a result, the hands in close-up are really Deighton's.

Filming

Saltzman wanted The Ipcress File to be an ironic and downbeat alternative to the portrayal of espionage in Ian Fleming's novels about the spy James Bond and the film series which followed from them. He also wanted it to be more in the style of his previous realist films. The Ipcress File therefore became the first of the nominally rival Harry Palmer series and some aspects are reminiscent of film noir. In contrast to Bond's public school background and playboy lifestyle, Palmer is a working class Londoner who lives in a Notting Hill bedsit and has to put up with red tape and inter-departmental rivalries. The action is set entirely in "a gritty, gloomy, decidedly non-swinging" London with humdrum locations, aside from the Royal Albert Hall.

The film was made at Pinewood Studios with sets designed by the art directors Peter Murton and Ken Adam. The film was shot on location around London in the widescreen screen ratio using Techniscope. In this format, the normal 35mm film frame is split in half, each now taking up only two perforations on the edges of the film stock rather than usual four. The format was introduced by Technicolor Italia in 1963 and allowed for a greater depth of field as it was shot with shorter focal length lenses than used in the anamorphic widescreen processes. This allowed cinematographer Otto Heller to construct images in deep focus, shooting behind objects and allowing both the objects in the foreground and the action taking place in the background to be in focus.

Sound
John Barry, who had worked on all of the Bond films up to this time, composed the music score for the soundtrack. As opposed to the electric guitar which carried the melody in the "James Bond Theme", Barry made prominent use of a cimbalom. The complex electronic sound effect of the brain-washing process was conceived by sound engineer Norman Wanstall and created by the BBC Radiophonic Workshop.

Reception
When the film premiered at the Leicester Square Theatre in London on 18 March 1965, the film critic for The Times had mixed feelings about it. While enjoying the first part of the film, and generally praising Michael Caine, the critic found the second half bewildering to the extent that the characters "cease to be pleasantly mystifying and become just irritatingly obscure." A review in Variety was largely positive, describing the film as "anti-Bond" for its unglamorous depiction of espionage, and praising Caine's understated performance but criticizing the sometimes "arty-crafty" camera work.

Subsequently, the film has come to be recognized as a classic. The Ipcress File is included on the British Film Institute's BFI 100, a list of 100 of the best British films of the 20th century, at No. 59. The review website Rotten Tomatoes sampled 31 critics resulting in an aggregate rating of 98%.

The film won the BAFTA Award for Best British Film, and Ken Adam won the award for 'Best British Art Direction, Colour'.

Screenwriters Bill Canaway and James Doran received a 1966 Edgar Award from the Mystery Writers of America for Best Foreign Film Screenplay.

Sequels
There were two immediate sequels starring Harry Palmer: Funeral in Berlin (1966) and Billion Dollar Brain (1967). Decades later Michael Caine returned to the character in Harry Alan Towers's Bullet to Beijing (1995) and Midnight in Saint Petersburg (1996).

TV Series

In December 2020, it was announced that ITV will adapt The Ipcress File as a six-part TV serial.

See also
 BFI Top 100 British films

Notes

References

External links
  
  
 
 
 
 The Ipcress File – Photos
 Kees Stam's Harry Palmer movie site and filming locations
 The Deighton Dossier
 The Ipcress File Blu-ray review

1965 films
British spy films
Cold War spy films
1960s spy films
1960s thriller films
Political thriller films
Films based on British novels
Films based on mystery novels
Films set in London
Films shot in London
Films directed by Sidney J. Furie
Fiction about mind control
Films scored by John Barry (composer)
Best British Film BAFTA Award winners
Films produced by Harry Saltzman
Cold War in popular culture
Films about hypnosis
Films about mind control
1960s English-language films
1960s British films